Bleu de France stands for

 Bleu de France (colour)
 MS Bleu de France, a cruise ship

See also
 France Bleu, radio network in France
 Les Bleus (disambiguation)